Ženite se momci (English translation: Get Married Boys) is the second studio album by Serbian pop singer Jelena Karleuša. It was released in 1996.

Track listing
Ženite se momci (Get Married Boys)
Hoću sa tobom (I Want It with You)
Tvojom ulicom (Down Your Street)
Moji drugovi (My Friends)
Ne mrzim te ni sad (I Don't Hate You, Even Now)
Sad smo stranci postali (We've Become Strangers)
Sada znam (I Know Now)
Mogu biti pamuk (I Can Be Cotton)
A, sada idem (But, Now I Leave)

References

1996 albums
Jelena Karleuša albums